The following outline is provided as an overview of and topical guide to Tennessee:

Tennessee – U.S. state located in the Southeastern United States.  Tennessee is the 36th most extensive and the 16th most populous of the 50 United States. Tennessee was admitted to the Union as the 16th state on June 1, 1796. Tennessee was the last state to leave the Union and join the Confederacy at the outbreak of the U.S. Civil War in 1861, and the first state to be readmitted to the Union at the end of the war. In the 20th century, Tennessee transitioned from an agrarian economy to a more diversified economy, aided at times by federal entities such as the Tennessee Valley Authority.  Tennessee has played a critical role in the development of many forms of American popular music, including rock and roll, blues, country, and rockabilly.

General reference 

 Names
 Common name: Tennessee
 Pronunciation: 
 Official name: State of Tennessee
 Abbreviations and name codes
 Postal symbol:  TN
 ISO 3166-2 code:  US-TN
 Internet second-level domain:  .tn.us
 Nicknames
 Big Bend State (refers to the Tennessee River)
 Butternut State (refers to the tan color of the uniforms worn by Tennessee soldiers in the American Civil War)
 Hog and Hominy State
 The Mother of Southwestern Statesmen
 Volunteer State (currently used on license plates)
 Adjectival: Tennessee
 Demonyms
 Tennessean
 Volunteer

Geography of Tennessee 

Geography of Tennessee
 Tennessee is: a U.S. state, a federal state of the United States of America
 Location
 Northern hemisphere
 Western hemisphere
 Americas
 North America
 Anglo America
 Northern America
 United States of America
 Contiguous United States
 Central United States
 East South Central States
 Southern United States
 Southeastern United States
 Population of Tennessee: 6,910,840 (2020 United States census)
 Area of Tennessee:
 Atlas of Tennessee

Places in Tennessee 

 Historic places in Tennessee
 National Historic Landmarks in Tennessee
 National Register of Historic Places listings in Tennessee
 Bridges on the National Register of Historic Places in Tennessee
 National Natural Landmarks in Tennessee
 National parks in Tennessee
 State parks in Tennessee

Environment of Tennessee 

Environment of Tennessee
 Climate of Tennessee
 Geology of Tennessee
 Protected areas in Tennessee
 State forests of Tennessee
 Superfund sites in Tennessee

Natural geographic features of Tennessee 

 Rivers of Tennessee

Regions of Tennessee 

Grand Divisions of Tennessee
 Western Tennessee
 Middle Tennessee
 Eastern Tennessee

Administrative divisions of Tennessee 

 The 95 counties of the state of Tennessee
 Municipalities in Tennessee
 Cities and towns in Tennessee
 State capital of Tennessee: Nashville
 City nicknames in Tennessee

Demography of Tennessee 

Demographics of Tennessee

Government and politics of Tennessee 

Politics of Tennessee
 Form of government: U.S. state government
 United States congressional delegations from Tennessee
 Tennessee State Capitol
 Political party strength in Tennessee

Branches of the government of Tennessee 

Government of Tennessee

Executive branch of the government of Tennessee 
 Governor of Tennessee
 Lieutenant Governor of Tennessee
 Secretary of State of Tennessee
 State departments
 Tennessee Department of Agriculture 
 Tennessee Department of Commerce and Insurance
 Tennessee Department of Correction
 Tennessee Department of Education
 Tennessee Department of Environment and Conservation
 Tennessee Department of Finance and Administration
 Tennessee Department of Health
 Tennessee Department of Intellectual and Developmental Disabilities
 Tennessee Department of Labor and Workforce Development
 Tennessee Department of Mental Health and Substance Abuse Services
 Tennessee Department of Personnel
 Tennessee Department of Revenue
 Tennessee Department of Safety and Homeland Security
 Tennessee Department of Tourist Development
 Tennessee Department of Transportation
 Tennessee Department of Veterans Affairs
 Tennessee Military Department

Legislative branch of the government of Tennessee 

 Tennessee General Assembly (bicameral)
 Upper house: Tennessee Senate
 Lower house: Tennessee House of Representatives

Judicial branch of the government of Tennessee 

Courts of Tennessee
 Supreme Court of Tennessee

Law and order in Tennessee 

Law of Tennessee

 Cannabis in Tennessee
 Capital punishment in Tennessee
 Individuals executed in Tennessee
 Constitution of Tennessee
 Crime in Tennessee
 Gun laws in Tennessee
 Law enforcement in Tennessee
 Law enforcement agencies in Tennessee
 Tennessee State Police

Military in Tennessee 

 Tennessee Air National Guard
 Tennessee Army National Guard

History of Tennessee 

History of Tennessee

History of Tennessee, by period 

Prehistory of Tennessee
English Province of Carolina, 1663–1707
French colony of Louisiane, 1699–1763
British Province of Carolina, 1707–1712
British Province of North Carolina, 1712–1776
French and Indian War, 1754–1763
Treaty of Fontainebleau of 1762
Treaty of Paris of 1763
British Indian Reserve, 1763–1783
Royal Proclamation of 1763
American Revolutionary War, April 19, 1775 – September 3, 1783
United States Declaration of Independence, July 4, 1776
Treaty of Paris, September 3, 1783
State of North Carolina since 1776
Cherokee–American wars, 1776–1794
Territory South of the River Ohio, 1790–1796
Nickajack Expedition, 1794
State of Tennessee becomes 16th State admitted to the United States of America on June 1, 1796
Creek War, 1813–1814
Andrew Jackson becomes 7th President of the United States on March 4, 1829
James K. Polk becomes 11th President of the United States on March 4, 1845
Mexican–American War, April 25, 1846 – February 2, 1848
Tennessee volunteers
American Civil War, April 12, 1861 – May 13, 1865
Tennessee in the American Civil War, 1861–1865
Eleventh state to declare secession from the United States on June 8, 1861
Eleventh state admitted to the Confederate States of America on July 2, 1861
Battle of Fort Donelson, February 11–16, 1862
Battle of Shiloh, April 6–7, 1862
Stones River Campaign, November 20, 1862 – January 2, 1863
Battle of Stones River, December 31, 1862 - January 2, 1863
Tullahoma Campaign, June 24 – July 3, 1863
Knoxville Campaign, September 22 – December 14, 1863
Chattanooga Campaign, October 1 – November 27, 1863
Battle of Lookout Mountain, November 24, 1863
Battle of Missionary Ridge, November 25, 1863
Franklin-Nashville Campaign, October 5 – December 25, 1864
Second Battle of Franklin, November 30, 1864
Battle of Nashville, December 15–16, 1864
Andrew Johnson becomes 17th President of the United States on April 15, 1865
Tennessee in Reconstruction, 1865–1866
First former Confederate state readmitted to the United States on July 24, 1866
Great Smoky Mountains National Park established on June 15, 1934
Civil Rights Movement from December 1, 1955, to January 20, 1969
Assassination of Martin Luther King Jr. in Memphis on April 4, 1968

History of Tennessee, by region 

 History of Nashville
 History of Memphis
 History of Knoxville
 History of Chattanooga
 History of Clarksville
 History of Murfreesboro
 History of Franklin
 History of Jackson
 History of Johnson City
 History of Kingsport

History of Tennessee, by subject 

 History of sports in Tennessee
 History of the Tennessee Titans

History publications on Tennessee 

 Tennessee Encyclopedia of History and Culture

Historical museums and societies in Tennessee 
 East Tennessee Historical Society

Culture of Tennessee 

Culture of Tennessee
 Museums in Tennessee
 Religion in Tennessee
 The Church of Jesus Christ of Latter-day Saints in Tennessee
 Episcopal Diocese of Tennessee
 Scouting in Tennessee
 State symbols of Tennessee
 Flag of the State of Tennessee 
 Great Seal of the State of Tennessee

The arts in Tennessee 
 Music of Tennessee

Sports in Tennessee 

Sports in Tennessee

Economy and infrastructure of Tennessee 

Economy of Tennessee
 Communications in Tennessee
 Newspapers in Tennessee
 Radio stations in Tennessee
 Television stations in Tennessee
 Health care in Tennessee
 Hospitals in Tennessee
 Transportation in Tennessee
 Airports in Tennessee
 State routes in Tennessee
 US and Interstate routes in Tennessee

Education in Tennessee 

Education in Tennessee
 Schools in Tennessee
 School districts in Tennessee
 High schools in Tennessee
 Colleges and universities in Tennessee
 University of Tennessee system
 University of Tennessee
 University of Tennessee Agriculture Farm Mound
 University of Tennessee Anthropological Research Facility
 University of Tennessee Arboretum
 University of Tennessee Botanical Gardens
 University of Tennessee College of Dentistry
 University of Tennessee College of Law
 University of Tennessee College of Medicine
 University of Tennessee Fencing Club
 University of Tennessee Health Science Center
 University of Tennessee Medical Center
 University of Tennessee Police
 University of Tennessee Press
 University of Tennessee Space Institute
 University of Tennessee at Chattanooga
 University of Tennessee at Chattanooga Marching Mocs
 University of Tennessee at Martin
 University of Tennessee at Nashville
 Tennessee Board of Regents
 State Universities
 Austin Peay State University
 East Tennessee State University
 Middle Tennessee State University
 Tennessee State University
 Tennessee Technological University
 University of Memphis
 Community Colleges
 Chattanooga State Community College
 Cleveland State Community College
 Columbia State Community College
 Dyersburg State Community College
 Jackson State Community College
 Motlow State Community College
 Nashville State Community College
 Northeast State Community College
 Pellissippi State Community College
 Roane State Community College
 Southwest Tennessee Community College
 Volunteer State Community College
 Walters State Community College
 Tennessee Technology Centers

See also

Topic overview:
Tennessee

Index of Tennessee-related articles

References

External links 

Tennessee
Tennessee
 1